Megachile pyrenaea is a species of bee in the family Megachilidae. It was described by Pérez in 1890.

References

Pyrenaea
Insects described in 1890